Flight 933 may refer to

Scandinavian Airlines System Flight 933, crashed on 13 January 1969
Iberia Airlines Flight 933, runway incident on December 17, 1973
Widerøe Flight 933, crashed on 11 March 1982

0933